This is a list of Sheriffs of Anglesey. Following the conquest of Wales by Edward I, Anglesey was created a county of Wales under the Statute of Rhuddlan, 1284.

On 1 April 1974, under the provisions of the Local Government Act 1972, the office was replaced by that of the Shrievalty of Gwynedd.

1284–1499

20 March 1284: Sir Roger de Puleston of Emral (first sheriff, killed 1295)
16 September 1295: Thomas de Aunvers
1 April 1300: John de Havering
Michaelmas 1301: Walter de Wynton
Michaelmas 1302: Henry de Dynynton
Michaelmas 1305: Griffin ap Oweyn
Michaelmas 1308: Madoc Thloyt
4 March 1312: John de Sapy
8 August 1316: Eman ap Jevan
1396: Gwilym ap Griffydd of Penmynydd

16th century

17th century

18th century

19th century

20th century

For 1974 onwards see High Sheriff of Gwynedd.

References

 
Anglesey
Anglesey